Brâncoveanu may refer to:

 Constantin Brâncoveanu
 Constantin Brâncoveanu metro station
 Constantin Brâncoveanu University
 Constantin Brâncoveanu, a village in Dragalina Commune, Călăraşi County, Romania
Brâncoveanu, a village in Odobeşti Commune, Dâmboviţa County, Romania

See also 
 Brâncovenesc, type of architecture developed in Wallachia and Transylvania during the reign of Constantin Brâncoveanu
 Brâncovenești (disambiguation)
 Brâncoveni
 Brâncoveanca
 Branković
 Branko
 Branco (disambiguation)

Romanian-language surnames